Ian D. Whyte (23 January 194824 September 2019) was a British geographer and Professor of Historical Geography at the University of Lancaster. He was the author of many books, including Migrants, Emigrants and Immigrants: A Social History of Migration (1991), Climatic Change and Human Society (1995) and Scotland's Society and Economy in Transition (1997).

Career 
Whyte studied for his undergraduate and postgraduate degrees at the University of Edinburgh. His PhD thesis was on Agrarian change in lowland Scotland in the seventeenth century. He was appointed as Lecturer in Geography at Glasgow University and later as Lecturer at Lancaster University in 1979.

Whyte's interest was in the evolution of landscape, economy and society in early-modern Scotland, ranging from agriculture and rural society to urban development. Later, he also extended his research to the study of landscape change and socio-economic changes in the upland areas of Northern England, in particular the process of parliamentary enclosure. He was also keenly interested in issues of landscape and heritage management in the English Lake District.

During his career, he published 17 books and many journal articles. He was appointed to a personal chair in Historical Geography in 1996 and retired in 2012.

Whyte was also involved in developing Lancaster's Centre for North-West Regional Studies and was Editor of the Cumberland and Westmorland Antiquarian and Archaeological Society's journal, Transactions, for several years. He was also a founder Member and Chairman of the Brindle Historical Society.

Awards 
Whyte was awarded an Honorary DSc by the University of Edinburgh in 1989 and was awarded an Honorary Fellowship of the Royal Scottish Geographical Society in 1998 for ‘distinguished service to geography in Scotland’.

Bibliography

References 

1948 births
2019 deaths
Alumni of the University of Edinburgh
Academics of the University of Glasgow
Academics of Lancaster University
Fellows of the Royal Scottish Geographical Society
Cumberland and Westmorland Antiquarian and Archaeological Society